Oakdale Cemetery may refer to:

Oakdale Memorial Gardens, formerly Oakdale Cemetery, Davenport, Iowa
Oakdale Cemetery (Hendersonville, North Carolina)
Oakdale Cemetery (Washington, North Carolina)
Oakdale Cemetery (Wilmington, North Carolina)